The following is a timeline of the presidency of Donald Trump during the fourth and last quarter of 2020, from October 1 to December 31, 2020. This is also during the final month of his presidency from January 1 to 20, 2021, when Trump left office. To navigate quarters, see timeline of the Donald Trump presidency.

Timeline

Overview

President Trump tested positive for COVID-19 and treated at Bethesda Naval Hospital, campaigned for the ongoing presidential election, participated in the final presidential debate, lost the presidential election to Joe Biden but refused to concede, attempted to overturn the election results, urged his supporters to march to the Capitol resulting in multiple deaths during the attack and interrupting the electoral vote count, suspended from social media, faced his second impeachment for incitement of insurrection but later acquitted, tackling the ongoing COVID-19 pandemic by extending the nationwide Centers for Disease Control and Prevention guidelines throughout the month of October.

October 2020

November 2020

December 2020

January 2021

See also
 Presidential transition of Donald Trump
 First 100 days of Donald Trump's presidency
 List of executive actions by Donald Trump
 List of presidential trips made by Donald Trump (international trips)

References

2020 Q4
Presidency of Donald Trump
Presidency of Donald Trump
October 2020 events in the United States
November 2020 events in the United States
December 2020 events in the United States
January 2021 events in the United States
2020 timelines
2021 timelines
Political timelines of the 2020s by year
Articles containing video clips